Where Country Grows is the second studio album by American country music artist Ashton Shepherd. It was released on July 12, 2011 via MCA Nashville. The album's first single, "Look It Up" reached the Top 20 on the Billboard Hot Country Songs chart. The title track was released as the album's second single in July 2011.

Critical reception

Where Country Grows received positive reviews from music critics. Jessica Phillips of Country Weekly gave the album 3 and 1/2 stars out of 5, complimenting her songwriting and personality, while drawing comparisons to fellow country artists Miranda Lambert and Sunny Sweeney. She also stated that "Ashton’s twangy songs are fearless, introspective and unabashedly country, which just might peg her as a new Loretta Lynn." In his review for Allmusic, Stephen Thomas Erlewine referred to Shepherd as "a powerhouse singer that there’s never a relaxed moment on the record." He also went on to compliment the set as "mak[ing] considerable effort to brighten and broaden her sound, to bring in listeners who may not have been seduced by the late-night vibes of Sounds So Good." Judy Rosen of Rolling Stone gave the album 4 stars out of 5, favoring Shepherd's voice, which she found "perfect for her wise, witty, tough-minded songs." Boston Globe reviewed the album positively as "merg[ing] her deep-country style with a contemporary country sound, setting a modern groove to her rural Alabama persona," while highlighting the song "I'm Good" as ranking among country classics by Tammy Wynette and Reba McEntire. The New York Times favorably describing the record's biggest strength in Shepherd's accented vocals, and considered her vocal control a "real weapon."

Track listing

Personnel
 Wyatt Beard – background vocals
 Mark Beckett – drums
 Jim "Moose" Brown – Hammond B-3 organ, piano, Wurlitzer
 Pat Buchanan – electric guitar
 Melonie Cannon – background vocals
 J.T. Corenflos – electric guitar
 Dan Dugmore – steel guitar
 Kevin "Swine" Grantt – bass guitar
 Tony Creasman – drums, percussion
 Kenny Greenberg – baritone guitar
 Rob Hajacos – fiddle
 John Hobbs – Hammond B-3 organ, piano, Wurlitzer
 Mike Johnson – steel guitar
 Randy McCormick – clavinet, Hammond B-3 organ, piano, synthesizer
 Mickey Raphael – harmonica
 John Wesley Ryles – background vocals
 Ashton Shepherd – lead vocals
 Joe Spivey – fiddle
 Bobby Terry – acoustic guitar
 Scott Vestal – banjo
 Billy Joe Walker Jr. – acoustic guitar

Chart performance

Album

Singles

References

2011 albums
Ashton Shepherd albums
MCA Records albums
Albums produced by Buddy Cannon